Der Tag… Du bist erwacht (English: The day… You are awakened) is the second single from the 2005 Schiller album Tag und Nacht with vocals by German singer Jette von Roth. The single was officially released on 24 March 2006 and was peaking at number 43 on German singles chart in 2006. The single includes the song ″Wolkentraum″. The cover art work shows a graphic of the sun. The music video was shot in Barcelona.

Track listing

Maxi single

Version 2

Vinyl 
Single with silver cover

Credits 

 Producer, recorded by, mixed by, music written by Christopher von Deylen
 Lyrics written by Jette von Roth
 Artwork by Benjamin Wolf

Music video 

The music video for "Der Tag… Du bist erwacht" was produced by Free The Dragon Filmproduktion GmbH and was shot in 2006 in the Spanish city Barcelona by German director Marcus Sternberg. It has a length of 4:14 minutes. It's the 10th music video of Schiller. The video features Jette von Roth, Christopher von Deylen, a Spanish girl and a Spanish boy. The music video was shot in the Parc del Laberint d'Horta in Barcelona, Spain.

Charts 

References

External links
 
 The single on Discogs

2006 singles
Schiller (band) songs
Songs written by Christopher von Deylen
2005 songs
Island Records singles